The Schuman-Josaphat tunnel is a  double track rail tunnel in Brussels, which entered into service on 4 April 2016.  It links line 161 (Brussels-Namur) just after Meiser station and line 26 (Halle-Vilvoorde) at the Cinquantenaire/Jubelpark tunnel just before Schuman station. The line is numbered L161A. A key component of the Brussels RER project, it passes beneath avenue Plasky/Plaskylaan, place de Jamblinne de Meux/Jamblinne de Meuxplein and the Cortenbergh/Kortenberg road tunnel.  The position of the tunnel in the Brussels rail network is shown in the simplified map on the right.  Benefits of the project include:
 reducing the journey time from the European quarter (Schuman and Luxembourg stations) to the airport from half an hour to less than 15 minutes by opening a direct route and avoid having to change at Brussels North station
 opening a parallel route through Brussels to take pressure off the saturated Brussels North - Brussels South line

Project details

The project began in June 2008 and is planned to take 1645 days to complete. Construction is taking place in two phases. First, the shell was dug out, which finished in late 2011. Secondly, equipping the tunnel with track etc. was scheduled to last from late 2010 to late 2013.  In fact track laying began in 2014.

The tunnel was expected to be officially opened on 12 December 2015, but the opening was postponed until 9 April 2016 because the mandatory safety test could not be held due to the Brussels lockdown. The opening date was designed to enable the execution of the Brussels RER 2015 plan, which had to be modified until the tunnel can be put into service. The safety test was eventually held on 25 February 2016,  and the tunnel opened on April 4.

The cost of the tunnel is estimated at 210 million euros, funded through Beliris, a joint venture between the Belgian Federal State and the Brussels Region. The project is also managed by Infrabel.

Unusual construction techniques were used to limit disturbance to local residents and protect the appearance of Brussels. It was decided to carry out the work without opening the tunnel from the surface so the digging is being done without a tunnel boring machine, but rather by hand or using small excavators.  The Cortenbergh road tunnel was built with extra deep foundations to accommodate a future rail tunnel beneath it. Elsewhere the tunnel passes close beneath the cellars of buildings, and in any case delivering a TBM in central Brussels would have created great disruption.  Similar techniques were used during the construction of the underground junction passing under the Antwerp Central railway station.

References

External links
rail-be.net: amateur photos of Belgian railways, L161 section including progress photos of the tunnel

Rail transport in Brussels
Railway tunnels in Belgium
City of Brussels
Schaerbeek
Buildings and structures completed in 2016